The World tango dance tournament (in Spanish: Campeonato Mundial de Baile de Tango, also known as Mundial de Tango) is an annual competition of Argentine Tango, held in Buenos Aires, Argentina, usually in August, as part of the Buenos Aires Tango Festival organized by the city's government. In 2014 the events were between 13-26/August.

The competition consists of two categories: "Tango de Pista" (Salon Tango), which has strict rules  about the usage of traditional milonga figures, and "Tango Escenario" (Stage Tango), which is more choreographic and includes elements from other dance disciplines, such as ballet.  Previously the competition was only open to couples consisting of men and women but in 2013 the rules were relaxed to allow same gender couples (man dancing with man, or woman with woman) to enter the competition.

The World Cup competition is the final leg of a series of pre-competitions held around the world starting from March. Traditionally the city of Buenos Aires and various municipalities choose their own "Municipal" champions who get wildcards into the final rounds. The same wildcard advantage is also given to national or regional champions of recognized competitions; These include Uruguay (UY), Chile (Cali, CL), Colombia (Bogota, CO), Brazil (Rio de Janeiro, BR), USA (San Francisco, US), Russia (Moscow, RU), China (Nanjing, CN), Japan (Tokyo, JP), Korea (Seoul, KR), France (Paris, FR), United Kingdom (London, UK), EU (Campeonato Europeo, Italy).

New municipalities in 2016: Turkey and the region (Istanbul, TR).

The first edition of the Mundial de Tango competition was held in 2003.

A closely related and highly influential event is the Buenos Aires City competition. The competition rules state that members of the couple must both have "DNI" (i.e. have a resident status of 2 years or more) in Argentina. The competition may be considered somewhat even more demanding because the participants can compete in several dance categories: either Tango Senior (age 40 or older) or Tango Adulto (age 18-39) plus Vals or Milonga. Only couples Carlos Estigarribia & María Laura Sastría (2015) and Jimena Hoffner & Fernando Carrasco (2008), have won the triple championship. The winners of the tango categories are granted direct access to the final qualifying round in Mundial de Tango. Couples in positions 2 through 5 are granted direct access to the semifinals in Mundial de Tango. These couples represent the city of Buenos Aires in the world cup. The City competition's winners and runners-up are likely to become highly regarded and sought out teachers worldwide.

Worth mentioning is the Campeonato inter milongas (CIM). In 2015 the milongas of Buenos Aires (El Fulgor de Villa Crespo, Salón Canning, Salón El Pial, Club Sunderland, Club Ciencia y Labor) started arranging monthly competitions whose final culminate in December. There are no restrictions in nationality or residence status of Argentina for the participants. The two monthly winning couples are voted for qualifying rounds and final by the audience and not selected judges.

El Mundial de Tango Winners by year

Campeonato Metropolitano de Baile de Tango de Buenos Aires Winners by year 

The Buenos Aires city competition is held in May in the capital of Argentina.

European Tango Championship (Buenos Aires preliminary) Winners by year 

The competition is held at the beginning of July in Italy and results are reported by the European tango ASD organization.

Argentine Tango UK Official Championship (Buenos Aires preliminary) Winners by year 

The competition is held during May–June in London and the results are usually reported in Tangofolly community network.

Campionato Italiano di Tango Winners by year 

These results are national tango championships of Italy held annually in the second week of July. Note that in 2015 the city of Rome started holding their own tango championships similar to Buenos Aires city championships.

Argentine Tango USA Championship by year 

These results are national tango championships of the USA. The event is held annually during the week of Easter.

References

External links 
 
 European Tango Championship site, a subsidiary of Mundial de Tango.
Official Tangofolly community website

Ballroom dance competitions
Annual events in Argentina
Tango dance
Winter events in Argentina
Tango